Sagalassa lilacina is a moth in the family Brachodidae. It was described by Walsingham. It is found in Central America.

References

Natural History Museum Lepidoptera generic names catalog

Brachodidae